UTS is a discontinued implementation of the UNIX operating system for IBM mainframe (and compatible) computers. Amdahl created the first versions of UTS, and released it in May 1981, with UTS Global acquiring rights to the product in 2002. UTS Global has since gone out of business.

System requirements 
UTS Release 4.5 supports the following S/390 model processors and their successors:

 Amdahl 5990, 5995A, 5995M series of ECL processors
 Amdahl Millennium Global Server series of CMOS processors
 Fujitsu Global Server
 IBM ES/9000/9021 series of ECL processors
 IBM G4, G5 & G6 Servers (the 9672 R and X series of CMOS processors)

History
The UTS project had its origins in work started at Princeton University in 1975 to port UNIX to the IBM VM/370 system. Team members there were Tom Lyon, Joseph Skudlarek, Peter Eichenberger, and Eric Schmidt. Tom Lyon joined Amdahl in 1978, and by 1979 there was a full Version 6 Unix system on the Amdahl 470 being used internally for design automation engineering. In late 1979 this was updated to the more commonly ported Version 7.

In 1980 Amdahl announced support for Unix on the System 470. Five years later, IBM announced its own mainframe Unix, IX/370, as a competitive response to Amdahl.

The commercial versions of UTS were based on UNIX System III and UNIX System V. In 1986, Amdahl announced the first version to run natively on IBM/370-compatible hardware, UTS/580 for its Amdahl 580 series of machines; previous Unix ports always ran as "guests" under the IBM VM hypervisor. Version 4.5 was based on Unix System V, Release 4 (SVR4).

See also 
 Linux on IBM Z
 OpenSolaris for System z
 UNIX System Services in OS/390 and its successors

References

External links 
 UTS Global home page (archived page at Archive.org, April 2008)

Unix variants
1981 software